A cold chill (also known as chills, the chills or simply thrills) is described by David Huron as, "a pleasant tingling feeling, associated with the flexing of hair follicles resulting in goose bumps (technically called piloerection), accompanied by a cold sensation, and sometimes producing a shudder or shiver." Dimpled skin is often visible due to cold chills especially on the back of the neck or upper spine. Unlike shivering, however, it is not caused by temperature, but rather is an emotionally triggered response when one is deeply affected by things such as music, speech, or recollection. It is similar to autonomous sensory meridian response; both sensations consist of a pleasant tingling feeling that affects the skin on the back of the neck and spine.

See also
 Chills
 Autonomous sensory meridian response
 Frisson

References

Symptoms and signs